Osmankajärvi is a medium-sized lake in the Oulujoki main catchment area. It is located in the region Kainuu in Finland.

See also
List of lakes in Finland

References

Kainuu
Lakes of Puolanka